Oxford Policy Management (OPM) is an international development consulting firm which aims to help low- and middle-income countries achieve growth and reduce poverty and disadvantage through public policy reform.

The company works with donor organisations (which have included UNICEF and the World Bank), governments and NGOs focusing on areas such as economic development, health, education, climate change and social welfare, with a strong focus on research.

OPM is headquartered in Oxford, UK, and has several hundred staff and a global network of offices.

History
Born out of the University of Oxford in 1979, when it was originally known as the Food Supply Analysis Group, OPM initially focused on applied research to help solve the food security problems of Eastern and Southern Africa. Five years later it became the Food Studies Group, addressing both the supply and demand sides of public services, supported by statistics and survey capabilities.

In 1996 Oxford Policy Management was established as a limited company, separate from the University of Oxford. The company was owned half by staff and half by investors, former employees and friends of OPM, as it is today. In 2007 OPM set up its first international office in Islamabad, Pakistan, led by Pakistani nationals, and by the mid-2010s it had offices across Africa and Asia.

Issues addressed
Examples of OPM's studies and policy work include:
 Climate change: Action on Climate Today, a programme developing strategies to combat climate change impacts with South Asian governments 
 Education: Education Data, Research and Evaluation in Nigeria (EDOREN)
 Financial sector development: Towards Impact-Oriented Measurement (IOM) Systems for the FSD Network (with FSD Africa, a financial sector development programme)
 Health: partner in Health & Education Resource & Advice Team (HEART)
 Natural Resources and Energy: the first global study of mineral dependence, Blessing or curse? The rise of mineral dependence among low- and middle-income countries
 Poverty and social protection: Public works programmes for protection and climate resilience: theory of change and evidence in low-income countries
 Social care services: development of palliative care services for the Republic of Serbia

References

External links 
 Homepage

International development agencies
International management consulting firms
1979 establishments in England
British companies established in 1979
Consulting firms established in 1979
Companies based in Oxford
Management consulting firms of the United Kingdom